The 1994 Big Eight men's basketball tournament was held March 11–13 at Kemper Arena in Kansas City, Missouri.

Fourth-seeded Nebraska defeated #2 seed  in the championship game, 77–68, to earn the conference's automatic bid to the 1994 NCAA tournament.

Bracket

References

Tournament
Big Eight Conference men's basketball tournament
Big Eight Conference men's basketball tournament
Big Eight Conference men's basketball tournament